Pirga is a genus of moths in the family Erebidae. The genus was erected by Per Olof Christopher Aurivillius in 1891.

Species
Pirga bipuncta Hering, 1926 eastern Africa
Pirga cryptogena Collenette, 1931 Uganda
Pirga loveni Aurivillius, 1922
Pirga magna Swinhoe, 1903 eastern Africa
Pirga mirabilis Aurivillius, 1891 Gabon
Pirga mnemosyne Rebel, 1914 Congo
Pirga pellucida Wichgraf, 1922
Pirga transvalensis Janse, 1915 southern Africa
Pirga ubangiana Schultze, 1934 north-western Congo
Pirga weisei Karsch, 1900 eastern Africa

References

Lymantriinae